Weesen may refer to:

 Weesen, Switzerland, a village in the canton of St. Gallen
 Weesen, Germany, a village in Lower Saxony